Thomas Romain (born 1977 or 1978) is a French animator who is responsible for creating Code Lyoko alongside Tania Palumbo. He is also responsible for designing and co-directing the Franco-Japanese animated series Ōban Star-Racers, which would be the start of his career in Japan. He's also the founder and creative director of Studio No Border.

In early 2017 Romain attracted mainstream media attention when he began tweeting illustrations he had drawn based on his children's sketches.

Works

French animation
 Code Lyoko (creator)
 Code Lyoko: Evolution (creator)
 Ōban Star-Racers (character design, director)

Anime
 Aria the Natural (Design Works)
 Aria the OVA ~Arietta~ (Layout Animation Director)
 Engage Planet Kiss Dum (Art Design)
 Basquash! (Original Concept, Art Director, Mechanical Concept Design, Key Animation)
 Senki Zesshō Symphogear (Art Director)
 Space Dandy (Spaceship Design)
 Macross Delta (World Design)
 Cannon Busters (Supervising Director)
 Carole & Tuesday (World Design)
 SK8 the Infinity (Skateboard Design)

References

External links
 
 

1970s births
Year of birth missing (living people)
Living people
Film people from Besançon
French animators
French animated film directors
French storyboard artists